The United States National Space Science Data Center catalogued 157 spacecraft placed into orbit by launches which occurred in 1968.
The first crewed Apollo missions occurred in 1968. It was also the year in which Earth lifeforms first left low Earth orbit, during the successful Zond 5 mission, and the year that humans first left low Earth orbit, during the successful Apollo 8 mission.

Launches

Key

January

|}

April

|}

June 

|}

October

|}

December 

|}

Deep space rendezvous

Orbital Launch Summary

References

1968 in science
1960s in transport
1968